Jennifer Malat is an American sociologist. She is associate vice president for development in the Office of Development and Alumni Relations at Virginia Commonwealth University.

Early life and education
Malat was raised in Rochester, Minnesota and attended the University of Minnesota for her Bachelor of Science degree in sociology. She then traveled to Michigan to earn her Master's degree and PhD from the University of Michigan.

Career
Upon receiving her PhD, Malat joined the faculty of sociology at the University of Cincinnati as an assistant professor in 2000. She was promoted to associate professor in 2006 and full professor in 2014. Malat’s research examines how inequities, particularly racial inequity, affect health.

In 2011, she was appointed director of the University of Cincinnati's Kunz Center for Social Research.  Later, Malat co-founded  The Cincinnati Project with Earl Wright II in 2013 and served as its founding director until 2020. The project was a research initiative aimed at promoting equity throughout the city.

In 2020, Malat left her position at the University of Cincinnati to become the dean of the Virginia Commonwealth University College of Humanities and Sciences. In 2022, she joined the Office of Development and Alumni Relations to support senior leaders' efforts to ensure an inclusive approach to philanthropy at Virginia Commonwealth University.

References

Living people
Academics from Minnesota
People from Rochester, Minnesota
University of Minnesota College of Liberal Arts alumni
University of Michigan alumni
University of Cincinnati faculty
Virginia Commonwealth University faculty
American sociologists
American women sociologists
Year of birth missing (living people)
21st-century American women